Monomania is a 19th-century psychiatry term.

Monomania may also refer to:
Monomania (Car Seat Headrest album), 2012
Monomania (Clarice Falcão album), 2013
Monomania (Deerhunter album), 2013
Monomania (The Word Alive album), 2020